Princess Marina Hospital (PMH) is a provincial, government-funded hospital in Botswana. , PMH is the largest referral hospital in Botswana, with 530 in-patient beds. It is named after Princess Marina.

Location
The hospital is located in the city of Gaborone, at the corner of North Ring Road and Notwane Road. One block west of Marina Hospital lies the National Museum of Botswana, and two blocks to the east of the hospital, is the Botswana National Stadium. The geo-graphical coordinates of the hospital are: 24°39'25.0"S, 25°55'26.0"E (Latitude:-24.656944; Longitude:25.923889).

History
The hospital was built to mark the independence of Botswana (formerly Bechuanaland) from the British, on 30 September 1966. The buildings were officially commissioned by her Royal Highness, the Duchess of Kent Princess Marina and the hospital was named after her.

Facilities 
Princess Marina Hospital has about 530 beds. Facilities include (a) a dialysis unit, for the diagnosis and treatment of kidney diseases (b) a medical laboratory, for the diagnosis of various infections and diseases (c) a blood bank for the storage and preservation of donated blood (d) a physiotherapy unit that provides comprehensive service to hospital inpatients (e) a radiotherapy unit and (f) a pathology laboratory.

Other facilities include (g) a psychiatry unit (h) a CT Scanner (i) an angiography unit (j) facilities for prostate screening (k) an Intensive Care Unit (ICU) and 
(l) Radiotherapy equipment.

References

External links 
 Webpage of the Botswana Ministry of Health

Hospitals in Botswana
Hospitals established in 1966
1966 establishments in Botswana
Buildings and structures in Botswana